The Tattoo Shop is an American reality show series that premiered on March 15, 2018 on Facebook Watch. It follows a group of tattoo artists as they open up a new shop in Miami, Florida.

The show airs two episodes per week, with Thursdays offering a behind-the-scenes look into the lives of the artists and their clients. Friday's episodes feature a live tattoo experience on "Mystery Tattoo". Each week, a client agrees to get a tattoo, sight unseen. This tattoo is left in the hands of the Facebook community, who make the creative decisions on the design and where the art is drawn on the body.

Premise
The Tattoo Shop follows "renowned inksters Ami James, Chris Nunez, Chris Garver, Darren Brass, and Tommy Montoya as they open their new tattoo shop, Liberty City Tattoo, in Wynwood, Miami."

Production

Development
On March 9, 2018, it was announced that Facebook Watch had ordered a first season of The Tattoo Shop, a new reality series featuring the stars of Miami Ink and NY Ink. The featured tattoo artists include Ami James, Chris Nunez, Chris Garver, Darren Brass, and Tommy Montoya. Kevin Johnston is set to act as showrunner for the series and executive produce alongside Ryan Duffy.

Marketing
Simultaneously with the initial series announcement, Facebook released a trailer for the first season of the show.

Episodes

See also
 List of original programs distributed by Facebook Watch

References

External links
 

Facebook Watch original programming
2010s American reality television series
2018 American television series debuts
2018 American television series endings
English-language television shows
American non-fiction web series